Familien Gyldenkål sprænger banken ( "The Goldcabbage Family Breaks the Bank") is a 1976 Danish comedy film directed by Gabriel Axel.

It was the second in a series of three films about the eccentric Gyldenkål family, a sequel to Familien Gyldenkål (1975) also directed by Axel, and followed by Familien Gyldenkål vinder valget (1977) directed by Bent Christensen.

Cast 
 Axel Strøbye
 Kirsten Walther
 Birgitte Bruun
 Martin Miehe-Renard
 Karen Lykkehus
 Jens Okking
 Bertel Lauring
 Sejr Volmer-Sørensen
 Ole Monty
 Grethe Sønck
 Kjeld Nørgaard
 Gyrd Løfqvist
 Poul Thomsen
 Birger Jensen
 William Kisum
 Gabriel Axel

References

External links 
 
 
 

1975 comedy films
1975 films
1976 comedy films
1976 films
Danish comedy films
Films directed by Gabriel Axel
1970s Danish-language films